The Sebeș (Hungarian: Sebes-patak, meaning "Speedy Creek") is a river in the Gurghiu Mountains, Mureș County, northern Romania. It is a left tributary of the river Mureș. It flows through the commune of Rușii-Munți, and joins the Mureș in the village Sebeș.

References

Rivers of Romania
Rivers of Mureș County